Marco Fusi may refer to:
 Marco Fusi (clarinetist) (born 1972), Italian clarinetist and composer
 Marco Fusi (violinist), Italian violinist, violist and viola d'amore player